The Alpi Pioneer 300 Kite is an Italian light-sport aircraft designed and produced by Alpi Aviation  of Pordenone. The aircraft is supplied as a kit for amateur construction or complete and ready-to-fly.

Design and development
The aircraft was designed to comply with the US light-sport aircraft rules. It features a cantilever low-wing, an enclosed cockpit with two-seats-in-side-by-side configuration under a bubble canopy, fixed tricycle landing gear and a single engine in tractor configuration.

The Pioneer 300 Kite is a higher take-off weight and fixed gear version of the Alpi Pioneer 300, with improved maneuverability for flight training. Apart from being available fully assembled it is also available as two different kits, one a 51% kit and the other EuroKit, which includes a factory assembled airframe, but lacks the engine installation.

The aircraft is made from wood and covered with composite material. Standard engines available are the  Rotax 912UL, as well as the  Rotax 912ULS and 912iS four-stroke powerplants.

As of January 2017, the design does not appear on the Federal Aviation Administration's list of approved special light-sport aircraft.

Specifications (Pioneer 300 Kite)

References

External links
Official website

Pioneer 300 Kite
2010s Italian ultralight aircraft
Light-sport aircraft
Single-engined tractor aircraft